Spring Mill station is a suburban commuter railroad station on the SEPTA Manayunk/Norristown Line in Montgomery County, Pennsylvania. Its official address is Station Avenue near Hector Street, Conshohocken (ZIP code 19428), but it is actually in the Spring Mill section of Whitemarsh Township. The station is located south of Hector Street, where North Lane deadends at the Schuylkill River.

The original station was established by the Reading Railroad about 1880, and took its name from the nearby 18th-century grist mill.

In FY 2013, Spring Mill station had a weekday average of 378 boardings and 358 alightings.  It has a 154-space parking lot, and is handicapped-accessible. The Schuylkill River Trail passes next to the station.

Due to the proximity of the Schuylkill River and a pair of tributary streams, the station is periodically subjected to flooding, resulting in the temporary suspension of all service on the Manayunk/Norristown Line.  A project to replace the line's signal system is underway in 2013 that is intended to confine future flooding closures on the line to the section above Miquon station, by allowing partial service further down the line instead of no service on the line at all.

Station layout

References

External links
SEPTA - Spring Mill Station

SEPTA Regional Rail stations
Former Reading Company stations
Railway stations in Montgomery County, Pennsylvania